Walter Hachborn,  (July 24, 1921 – December 16, 2016) was a Canadian businessman and co-founder, with two others, of Home Hardware, a Canadian home improvement and construction retailer which supplies contractors and individual retail consumers.

Early life
Born in Conestogo, Ontario, he lived in St. Jacobs, Ontario most of his life.

Career
He started working in the hardware industry in 1938 and created Home Hardware in 1964 with two partners, Henry Sittler and Arthur Zilliax. He had been its president since the beginning seeing the company grow from 122 dealers to over 1100 stores and annual sales of over $6 billion. He retired from day-to-day operations in 1988 and retained the title of President Emeritus until 2010 with more than 75 years in the hardware industry.

Recognition
In 1985, he was awarded an honorary doctor of laws degree from Wilfrid Laurier University, where he served as a member of WLU's board of governors for 10 years. In 1988, the Retail Council of Canada recognized Hachborn's success at Home Hardware. In recognition of this accomplishment he was presented with the Distinguished Canadian Retailer of the Year Award. He was also awarded the distinction of Retailer of the Century in 1999. In 1999, he was made a Member of the Order of Canada. He was named to the Canadian Business Hall of Fame in 2014.

Death
Hachborn died on December 16, 2016, at the age of 95.

References

 

1921 births
2016 deaths
Businesspeople from Ontario
Canadian people of German descent
Canadian Lutherans
Members of the Order of Canada
People from Woolwich, Ontario
20th-century Lutherans